The 2004 Canadian Figure Skating Championships were held on January 5–11, 2004 in Edmonton, Alberta. It is a figure skating national championship held annually to determine the national champions of Canada and is organized by Skate Canada, the nation's figure skating governing body. Skaters competed at the senior and junior levels in the disciplines of men's singles, ladies' singles, pair skating, and ice dancing. Due to the large number of competitors, the senior men's and senior ladies' qualifying was split into two groups. The results of this competition were used to pick the Canadian teams to the 2004 World Championships, the 2004 Four Continents Championships, and the 2004 World Junior Championships.

Senior results

Men

Ladies

Pairs

Ice dancing

Junior results

Men

Ladies

Pairs

Ice dancing

External links
 2004 Canadian Championships

Canadian Figure Skating Championships
Canadian Figure Skating Championships
2004 in Canadian sports
2004 in Alberta